Atlantis Princess is the third Korean-language studio album by South Korean singer BoA, released on May 30, 2003 by SM Entertainment. 
Several singles were promoted off the album, including the promotional single "Lights of Seoul", "Atlantis Princess", and "Milky Way", with accompanying music videos produced for the latter two songs. The album was also released in some parts of Asia, such as the Philippines, Hong Kong and Taiwan, with the overseas version containing a bonus VCD. 

Commercially, the album debuted at number one on the top 50 Korean monthly charts, with initial monthly sales of nearly 128,000 in from two days of shipments in May. It was the 4th best-selling album of the year in South Korea with sales of over 345,000 copies.

Background and release 
The album's title track, "Atlantis Princess", was composed by Hwang Seong-je and is a fast-tempo dance song that lyrically is reminiscent of a fairy-tale; it depicts the lost continent of Atlantis and conveys a bright and hopeful message. The music video for the single was filmed in Australia over the course of six days in May 2003 and features BoA dancing on a rooftop surrounded by tall buildings in Sydney in addition to a grassy meadow and a sandy beach located in Kiama, New South Wales. BoA performed the song on live television for the first time on Inkigayo on June 1. 

The follow-up single "Milky Way" was written and produced by Kenzie. The Japanese version of the track was included as a B-side for her single "Double" and was added as a bonus track to her third Japanese album Love & Honesty (2004). "The Lights of Seoul" is a promo CD single which was a special release given to people who attended Hi Seoul Festival in May 2003, and was introduced on the website of the Seoul Metropolitan Government as a promotional track for the organization.

Reception

Commercial performance
Although Atlantis Princess was released at the end of May, it was the best-selling album of the month and debuted at number-one on the album chart issue for May 2003, selling 127,887 copies. It retained its number-one position the following month and sold an additional 124,747 copies. Atlantis Princess ended at number five in the year-end ranking of the best-selling albums in South Korea for 2003, selling a total of 345,313 copies throughout the year. It was the second best-selling album by a female artist during 2003 after Lee Soo-young's This Time.

Accolades 
"Atlantis Princess" won Best Dance Performance at the 2003 Mnet Music Video Festival, winning over Lee Hyori's "10 Minutes". In 2021, "Atlantis Princess" was ranked number 93 in Melon and Seoul Shinmuns list of Top 100 K-pop Songs of All Time.

Track listing

Charts

Monthly charts

Year-end charts

Sales

References

External links 
 
 
 Hi Seoul (seoul.go.kr)

BoA albums
2003 albums
SM Entertainment albums
Korean-language albums